Bangladesh Awami Swechasebak League is an associate body and the volunteer wing of the Bangladesh Awami League. Gazi Mesbaul Hossain Shachchu is the acting president of the Bangladesh Awami Swechasebak League. Its general secretary, Afzalur Rahman Babu.

History
Bangladesh Awami Swechasebak League was founded on 27 July 1994. It traces it's origin to the Swechchhasebak Bahini founded in 1949 at the establishment of the Awami League by Zillur Rahman.

In 2008, Pankaj Debnath, General Secretary of Bangladesh Awami Swechasebak League was sentenced to jail for corruption by a special anti-corruption court established in the MP hostel of the Jatiya Sangshad complex by the Caretaker Government during the 2006-2008 Bangladeshi political crisis. He is the incumbent Member of Parliament from Barisal-4.

On 25 November 2013, Rabiul Islam, the General Secretary of Deyara Union unit of Awami Swecchasebak League was killed in clashes with Bangladesh Nationalist Party supporters after they called a strike. Swechasabak League organized an exhibition on Sheikh Mujibur Rahman, called "History Speaks Up", at the Bangabandhu Memorial Museum on 15 August 2012. President of Sadarghat, Chittagong unit of Swechasebak League, Ibrahim Manik, was shot dead in December 2016 in Chittagong. On 1 August 2018, they bought out a procession of light in memory of President Sheikh Mujibur Rahman in a lead up to marking his assassination in August.

On 13 December 2018, Asadul Islam Ershad, General Secretary of Muladholi Union unit of the Awami Swechasebak League, was killed in general election related violence.

References

Bangladesh Awami League
1994 establishments in Bangladesh
Organisations based in Dhaka